The Black elite is any elite, either political or economic in nature, that is made up of people who identify as of Black African descent. In the Western World, it is typically distinct from other national elites, such as the United Kingdom's aristocracy and the United States' upper class.

United Kingdom

  

In the United Kingdom, the black community has largely consisted of immigrants and their descendants whose residency in the country dates from either the time of the old Empire or that of the new Commonwealth. Persons classified as being of African descent have nevertheless been a recognizable component of British society since at least the Elizabethan period.

An elite developed within the community over the course of several centuries. Its ranks were increased over time by the mixed-race children of colonial British aristocrats (such as Dido Elizabeth Belle), members of the older black elites of British Africa and the Caribbean (such as Sara Forbes Bonetta), the rise of black and mixed-race national leaders (such as Paul Boateng), and the success of numerous black and mixed-race persons in specialized industries, such as the arts (for example, Lenny Henry). 

Like their counterparts in the United States and elsewhere, members of the black elite historically took part in the campaign to abolish slavery in the empire. Some, like former enslaved African Olaudah Equiano, even became politically prominent by way of their efforts.

Following the abolition in the early 1800s, black people continued to gain prominence in Britain's social, political and cultural life. Mary Seacole was a heroine of the Crimean War, and Learie Constantine was an important cricketer.

Today, Britain's black and mixed-race people are included in the annual Powerlist—a ranking of the nation's most prominent people of color. A number of them, such as Boateng and Henry, have been made peers and/or knights of the realm. There is also a small community of British aristocrats that are of partially black descent. Emma Thynn (née McQuiston), the Marchioness of Bath as the wife of the 8th Marquess, belongs to this sub-group. Other notable members are Prince Archie of Sussex and Princess Lilibet of Sussex, the mixed-race children of Prince Harry and Meghan Markle, the Duke and Duchess of Sussex.

United States

In the North of the United States, many educated black people (taking advantage of their relative freedom) took part in abolitionist and suffragist activities. They also provided support to stations of the Underground Railroad prior to the abolition of slavery. Later, during the Reconstruction Era, a number of them took part in various professions and grew quite wealthy in places like Brooklyn.

In the South, an elite started forming before the American Civil War among free black people who managed to acquire property. Of the free people of color in North Carolina in the censuses from 1790 to 1810, 80% can be traced to African Americans free in Virginia during the colonial period. Most were descended from unions between free white women and enslaved or free Africans or African Americans. Free black people migrated into frontier Virginia and then to other states over several generations in the colonial period, as did many of their neighbors.  Extensive research into colonial court records, wills and deeds has demonstrated that most of those free families came from relationships or marriages between white women, servant or free, and black men, servant, free or slave. Such relationships were part of the more fluid relationships among the working class before the boundaries of slavery hardened.

During slavery times, white slaveholders and others were known to rape enslaved African women, fathering mixed-race children. There were also slaveholders who had caring relationships, common-law marriages, and legal marriages to enslaved black women. They sometimes freed such women and their children. Some slaveholders did provide for their mixed-race children by ensuring they were educated; in the earliest periods, they might be apprenticed to a trade or craft. In some cases, fathers arranged to settle property on their "natural" children. Whatever property the father passed on to the child was important in helping that person get a start in life. These mulattos in turn patterned their subsequent lives after "polite" white society. In some places, such as New Orleans, this coalesced into what was known as Plaçage.

In the South, the free black elite often took leadership roles within the church, black schools, and community. Natural leaders rose up from many different classes. Some developed catering businesses or other services that enabled them to take advantage of their white contacts through family and other connections. The black elite also enjoyed the benefits of living within the white neighborhoods, which further isolated them from the darker-skinned African Americans and which caused many of them to blame them for the downward shifts in life-style choices. Some lighter skinned black people even passed for white, and were assimilated into white society thereafter.
	
The Civil Rights Movement and affirmative action brought about many changes for the black elite. As the old elite died away, a new black elite emerged. Within its ranks are politicians, entrepreneurs, actors, singers, sports figures, and many more who are otherwise part of America's wider upper-middle class. The political leaders Barack Obama and Kamala Harris are prominent members of this new elite.

Other examples

 

 
In addition to those that have already been cited, groups from around the world that either are or once were generally thought to constitute a Black elite include:
 
 Abirus
 Affranchis
 Afro-Bolivian monarchy
 Aguda people
 Americo-Liberians
 Andriana
 Angolan Mestiços
 Aro Igbos
 Assimilados
 Black Loyalists
 Black Patriots
 Children of the Plantation
 Creoles of Color
Dahomeyan Fons
 Egba Alake Yorubas
 Emancipados
 Ethiopian nobility
 Évolués
 Fernandino peoples
 Ganwas
 Gbara clans of Mali
 Ghanaian chieftaincy
 Gold Coast Euro-Africans
 Kumasi Ashantis
 Links
 Masonic Order of Liberia
 Mourides
 Mulatto Haitians
 National Pan-Hellenic Council
 Nigerian bourgeoisie
 Nigerian chieftaincy
 Oyo Yorubas
 Pardo Brazilians
 Prazeros
 Prince Hall Freemasons
 Reformed Ogboni Fraternity
 Saro people
 Shirazis of the Swahili Coast
 Siddis of Janjira and Jafarabad
 Sierra Leone Creole people
 Sigma Pi Phi
 South African Inkosis

See also
 Aristocracy (class)
 Aristocracy (system)
 Elitism
 Nouveau Riche
 Old Money
 Upper class

References

Notes
Benjamin, Lois; The Black Elite, Nelson-hall Publishers/Chicago, 1991.
Landry, Bart.; The New Black Middle Class, University of California Press, 1987.

Further reading
Birmingham, Stephen. Certain People: America's Black Elite, Little Brown & Co., New York, NY, 1977.
Frazier, E. Franklin. Black Bourgeoisie, Fress Press, New York, NY, 1997.
Gatewood, Willard B. Aristocrats of Color: The Black Elite, 1880-1920, University of Arkansas Press, Arkansas, 2000.
Graham, Lawrence. Our Kind of People: Inside America's Black Upper Class, HarperCollins Publishers Inc., New York, NY, 1999.
Major, Gerri. Black Society, Johnson Publishing Company, Inc., Chicago, 1977.
Probing the Black Elite’s Role for the 21st Century-Issue 134. Retrieved April 30, 2007.
The Black Elite in America

 
Black British history
Black British culture
African-American demographics
African-American history
African-American upper class
African-American society
Upper class
High society (social class)